The M3 tripod is a weapon mount used on the M2HB Browning machine gun and the  Mk 19 grenade launcher. The M3 tripod has a total weight of 20 kilograms (44 pounds). The M205 tripod, formerly the XM205, is intended to replace it.

Specifications
The M3 tripod is designed for portability but due to its solid metal construction weighs in at 20kg (44lb). When fully extended it measures 14"(35.56cm)high by 61 1/2"(156.21cm)wide by 76"(193.04cm)long. When collapsed it measures 48 1/2"x 8"x 7" (123.19cm x 20.32cm x17.78cm). It has a total traverse range of 425mils with the T&E mechanism (traversing and elevating mechanism) and 6,400 mils without it. The maximum elevation is 100mils and the maximum depression is 250mils with the T&E mechanism. Without the T&E Mechanism, the tripod can angle the weapon at 285 mils up or 335 mils down from zero.

References

See also
XM205 tripod 
M2 tripod
M63 ground mount
M122 tripod
M192 Lightweight Ground Mount

Firearm components
United States Marine Corps equipment